Pas Kooshe is a village in Tamin Rural District, in the Nosratabad of Zahedan County, Sistan and Baluchestan Province, Iran. At the 2006 census, its population was 595, in 133 families.

References 

Populated places in Zahedan County